Underpotential deposition (UPD), in electrochemistry, is a phenomenon of electrodeposition of a species (typically reduction of a metal cation to a solid metal) at a potential less negative than the equilibrium (Nernst) potential for the reduction of this metal. The equilibrium potential for the reduction of a metal in this context is the potential at which it will deposit onto itself. Underpotential deposition can then be understood to be when a metal can deposit onto another material more easily than it can deposit onto itself.

Interpretation 
The occurrence of underpotential deposition is often interpreted as a result of a strong interaction between the electrodepositing metal M with the substrate S (of which the electrode is built). The M-S interaction needs to be energetically favoured to the M-M interaction in the crystal lattice of the pure metal M. This mechanism is deduced from the observation that UPD typically occurs only up to a monolayer of M (sometimes up to two monolayers). The electrodeposition of a metal on a substrate of the same metal occurs at an equilibrium potential, thus defining the reference point for the underpotential deposition. Underpotential deposition is much sharper on monocrystals than on polycrystalline materials.

References

Electrochemistry
Electrochemical potentials